Minggang is a town in Pingqiao District, Xinyang, Henan Province in Central China.

Transport

Airport
Xinyang Minggang Airport

Railway Stations
Minggang railway station
Minggang East railway station

Township-level divisions of Henan